Guido Morini (born in Milan in 1959) is an Italian pianist, organist, harpsichordist, musicologist and composer.

In the ensemble Accordone he performs early baroque works with singer Marco Beasley. Beasley is also the librettist for his Una Odissea, composed in 2001. His cycle Vivifice Spiritus Vitae Vis 2005, is composed on texts from the Vulgate Latin Bible.

Discography
Own compositions or arrangements
 Improvisando - Il jazz del Cinquecento. Paolo Pandolfo, Guido Morini, Thomas Boysen et al. GCD P30409 (Glossa)
 Una Odissea (Marco Beasley, Guido Morini - Accordone & Netherlands Wind Ensemble) (2002, NBELive)
 Vivifice spiritus vitae vis ("Servabo") (Marco Beasley, Guido Morini - Accordone) (2004, Cypres)
 Una Iliade (Marco Beasley, Guido Morini - Netherlands Wind Ensemble & Hilliard Ensemble) (2009, NBELive)

Performance of early music
 Accordone -  "Via Toledo" – Tarantelle e Canzoni alla Napolitana. ORF
 Accordone I Vox clamans ORF
 Accordone II L'Amore Ostinato ORF
 Accordone III Il sogno ORF
 Accordone IV Surprise ORF
 Trigonale 2003. Accordone (Alfio Antico, Marco Beasley, Guido Morini). ORF Edition Alte Musik, ORF-CD 364.
 Il salotto Napolitane Accordone ORF
 Su Leva, alza le ciglia! Frottole, Accordone. Live Festival "Italia Mia” ORF
 Simone Balsamino, Novellette e Madrigali. Diego Fasolis, Vanitas Ensemble, Guido Morini,(Dynamic)
 La Bella Noeva (Marco Beasley, Guido Morini - Accordone) (2003, Alpha)
 Le Frottole (Marco Beasley, Guido Morini - Accordone) (2005, Cypres)
 Recitar Cantando (Marco Beasley, Guido Morini - Accordone) (2006, Cypres)
 Il settecento Napoletano (Marco Beasley, Guido Morini - Accordone) (2007, Cypres)
 Fra' Diavolo (Marco Beasley, Guido Morini, Pino de Vittorio - Accordone) (2010, Arcana)
 Cantate Deo (a due tenori) (Marco Beasley / Guido Morini / Accordone) (2013, Alpha)
 Vivifice spiritus vitae vis (Marco Beasley / Guido Morini / Accordone) (2014, Cypres)

References

1959 births
Living people
Italian organists
Male organists
Italian harpsichordists
Italian musicologists
Italian composers
Italian male composers
Italian male pianists
21st-century pianists
21st-century organists
21st-century Italian male musicians